Expedition 50 was the 50th expedition to the International Space Station.

Robert S. Kimbrough, Andrei Borisenko and Sergey Ryzhikov transferred from Expedition 49. Expedition 50 began upon the departure of Soyuz MS-01 on October 28, 2016 and was concluded upon the departure of Soyuz MS-02 on April 10, 2017. The crew of Soyuz MS-03 were transferred to Expedition 51.

After the launch of Soyuz MS-03, Peggy Whitson, at age 56, became the oldest woman to fly into space. By taking command of Expedition 51 on April 10, 2017, she also became the first woman to command two ISS expeditions (after Expedition 16 in 2007–2008). Soyuz MS-03 docked at the International Space Station on November 19, 2016, bringing the total number of people in the station to 6.

Crew

Mission overview

Expedition 49/50 launch and docking

Soyuz MS-02 launched on October 19, 2016, transporting Robert S. Kimbrough, Andrei Borisenko and Sergey Ryzhikov, who would make up the Expedition 49/50 crew. MS-02 docked with the (Poisk (MRM-2) module on October 21, 2016.

Expedition 50/51 launch and docking

Soyuz MS-03 launched on November 17, 2016, transporting Oleg Novitskiy, Peggy Whitson and Thomas Pesquet. MS-03 docked with the Rassvet module on November 19, 2016.

Activities
On 25 December 2016 the crew celebrated Christmas by floating in micro-gravity and opening Christmas presents recently delivered on a Japanese cargo spacecraft. One astronaut wore a Santa hat in orbit. The French astronaut Pesquet shared special French food with the station crew. Pesquet also made a Christmas-time special video for the ESA.

Science activities

Uncrewed spaceflights to the ISS
A number of resupply missions visited the International Space Station during Expedition 50.

Spacewalks

See also

Christmas on the International Space Station

References

External links

 NASA's Space Station Expedition 50 page

Expeditions to the International Space Station
2016 in spaceflight
2017 in spaceflight